The Bard's Tale III: Thief of Fate is a computer fantasy role-playing video game created by Interplay Productions in 1988. It is the second sequel to The Bard's Tale. It was designed by Rebecca Heineman, Bruce Schlickbernd, and Michael A. Stackpole. The game was released for the Amiga, Apple II (64k), Commodore 64, and DOS.

Story
The player characters receive a letter from a dying man who informs them that, during a celebration of your defeat of the evil wizard Mangar, his true master—the Mad God Tarjan—arrived and unleashed foul creatures that destroyed the town of Skara Brae. The box cover states it thus:
Skara Brae is in ruins. Roscoe's Energy Emporium stands vacant. The Equipment Shoppe went under so quickly Garth was crushed. Your Bard hasn't stopped whimpering since he realized all the taverns were closed.... Someone—or some thing—has sealed the city's fate with an evil so vast, so unspeakable, that a host of Paladins and an army of Archmages are out-matched. Hard times call for subtlety. Smaller is better. Sneakier is better. What the world needs now is a thief. The Thief of Fate.

The game begins in a refugee camp outside the ruined Skara Brae, which replaces the now-destroyed adventurer's guild from the previous games. Besides the city ruins, the wilderness features a temple for healing, a tavern, and a number of special locations from where the party will embark on missions to other worlds over the course of their quest.

Skara Brae was scaled down considerably. The ruins are 16x16 map tiles instead of the city's 30x30 layout from The Bard's Tale I, though its layout remains recognizable. In the ruins of the Review Board, an old man—the sole survivor—directs the party to first kill one Brilhasti ap Tarj, a servant of the mad god Tarjan, in the "Mad God" dungeon below Skara Brae, a startup quest for the characters to attain power, which can be ignored if powerful characters were carried over from previous games. Next, the old man orders the party to retrieve artifacts from several other worlds and also teaches the group the chronomancer spells to be used at certain points in the wilderness to travel to these parallel dimensions and back:
Arboria (from Twilight Copse): Pleasant elf realm including the city of Ciera Brannia. They have to bring back the hero Valarian or get Valarian's Bow and the Arrows of Life. It turns out Valarian is long since dead and buried in a sacred grove with the items. The king will only allow the party to enter the grove if they first kill the local villain Tslotha Garnath with the Nightspear that can be obtained from Valarian's Tower. In Arboria, the party meets the warrior Hawkslayer for the first time, though he recalls meeting them before (a hint at the fact that the party is travelling not only between dimensions but also across time in their quest).
Gelidia (from Cold Peak): The party is next tasked to bring Lanatir or, if they cannot convince him to come, Lanatir's Sphere and the Wand of Power back from this dimension of magic. Gelidia turns out to be an icy wasteland with a great ice keep. In a nearby hut, a diary is found with the frozen corpse of a half-elf later identified as Alendar, who is suggested to be dead for a thousand years already. The diary relates how the garrison, lacking a hero like Hawkslayer this time, fared poorly against attackers who killed the god Lanatir. Lanatir was buried in his keep by his remaining followers, who then sealed it with powerful magic. Alendar, the last survivor, finally cast a spell of eternal winter upon the land to vanquish the invaders and then died in the cold himself.
Lucencia (from Crystal Springs): Shocked at the news of Lanatir's death as much as Valarian's, the old man sends the party to another pleasant world, Lucencia, where the gnome city of Celaria Bree is located. The party has to get the Belt of Alliria and the Crown of Truth. Unsurprisingly, Alliria has been dead for many moons already, and the items have to be retrieved from her tomb. This involves overcoming a dragon, and also Alliria's lover Cyanis, who was driven mad by being forced to watch Tarjan torture Alliria to death.
Kinestia (from Old Dwarf Mine): In this dwarven realm, the party has to retrieve Ferofist's Helm and the Hammer of Wrath. They arrive in the middle of a great war of the dwarves against robot-themed monsters and meet Hawkslayer again, curiously before they met him in Arboria. Ferofist is found mortally wounded. He asks the party to destroy the fruits of his foolish alliance with the dark one and leaves directions to the heart of the mechanical invasion. There, the party encounters Urmech, an artificial being who himself was created by Ferofist in violation of the God's Pact against further creation (a heinous act that, according to Urmech, helped free the dark one). When confronted, Urmech turns out to be quite reasonable. He points out that he has done no evil except to live, and that he created others of his kind to protect him and so that he will not be all alone. Having found or perhaps created a new kind of magic, Urmech offers to train certain character classes to become Geomancers, a new type of spellcaster. He also surrenders Ferofist's items to the party willingly, if they ask; though there is also the option of fighting him to claim the items.
Tenebrosia (from Shadow Rock): This world of paradox features a wilderness named "Nowhere" and a town called Black Scar. The party has to bring Sceadu's Cloak and the Helm of Justice back. Having allied with Tarjan, Sceadu will not willingly give away the items and has to be tracked down and slain in combat.
Tarmitia (from the Vale of Lost Warriors): The "land of unceasing warfare" is a dimension of perpetual war, with the party moving between interwoven battle sites such as Berlin, Rome, Troy, Hiroshima, Wasteland, Stalingrad, and Nottingham until they arrive at Tarmatia, where they have to obtain Werra's Shield and the Strifespear by besting the war god in combat. As mere mortals, they cannot really kill him, but then they are caught up in an attack by another deity immediately afterwards and witness Werra's death. They get the shield, but learn that the Strifespear was given to Hawkslayer.
Malefia (from Sulphur Springs): Upon returning to the old man, the party finds him mortally wounded. He instructs them to seek out and vanquish Tarjan in his domain, provides the spells required to go there and back (EVIL and LIVE), and reveals the location of the items the party brought back before he dies. From this point onwards, characters cannot level up in Skara Brae, but need to go to a Review Board in one of the Dimensions. With the items retrieved on their previous quests, the party can navigate Malefia, where they find the Strifespear on Hawkslayer's corpse, and finally confront and vanquish Tarjan himself. The canonical strategy (per the cluebook) is for a character of the thief or rogue class to kill Tarjan, by using their special combat ability to sneak up on an opponent from behind, hence the game's subtitle "Thief of Fate".

With Tarjan defeated, it is revealed that the player party took the places of the deities Tarjan killed, becoming a set of new stars in the sky.

Gameplay
This dungeon crawl game featured several improvements over its predecessors:

A graphical auto-mapping system for the 84 dungeon levels in the game (it was the first game to offer this type of map interface)
An enhanced save game feature
Two new spellcaster character classes (geomancer and chronomancer)

According to Shay Addams, The Bard's Tale III is:

Reception

A 1988 review in Computer Gaming World described Bard's Tale III as an improvement over its predecessor, but "still too heavily oriented towards mega-combat." The magazine in 1993 stated that "the series redeemed itself with the third installment, flawed though it was", adding that "the best parts are the quests themselves ... worth playing". One of the chief complaints with the game is, unlike in the first two titles, where spell points (which are expended to use spells) could be recharged instantly an unlimited number of times for a fee at Roscoe's Energy Emporium, there is no such method in this title. To recharge spell points of a spellcaster, the player must either spend time in outdoor areas during the day (spell points are regenerated by sunlight), equip mage-only weapons granting continuous spell point regeneration, or find and use an item called a harmonic gem, which are limited in number within the game.

The game was reviewed in 1988 in Dragon #138 by Hartley, Patricia, and Kirk Lesser in "The Role of Computers" column. The reviewers gave the game 3 out of 5 stars.

Reviews
Isaac Asimov's Science Fiction Magazine v12 n13 (1988 12 Mid)

Production
Michael Cranford, the creator of the Bard's Tale series, was not involved in this sequel, as he had decided to leave Interplay to study philosophy and theology.

The Bard's Tale III programmer Heineman has said that the original name of this game was to be Tales of the Unknown - Volume III: The Thief's Tale. Heineman also once sought to continue creating new Bard's Tale games, but was unsuccessful in obtaining the rights from Electronic Arts.

Michael A. Stackpole created the storyline of The Bard's Tale III and made maps for it. He has since become a successful author, having penned many novels in the hugely popular Star Wars and BattleTech series.

Bruce Schlickbernd and Michael Stackpole also collaborated on Interplay's Wasteland, Star Trek: 25th Anniversary, and Star Trek: Judgment Rites.

Remastered

During the Kickstarter campaign to create a proper fourth installment to the series, inXile partnered with Rebecca Heineman and her company Olde Sküül to remaster the original trilogy for modern personal computers running Mac OS and Microsoft Windows (instead of the emulated versions offered by inXile). After reaching an impasse in development, Olde Sküül and inXile agreed to transfer the project to Krome Studios.

The game was released as part of the remastered The Bard's Tale Trilogy on February 26, 2019. The remastered edition of the original trilogy was released  for Xbox One on August 13, 2019. This followed the acquisition of inXile Entertainment by Microsoft. The collection supports Xbox Play Anywhere.

See also
 Silversword

References

External links

The Bard's Tale Compendium
The Bard's Tale III at GameBase64
Bard's Tale Online

1988 video games
Amiga games
Apple II games
Commodore 64 games
DOS games
Fantasy video games
First-person party-based dungeon crawler video games
Games commercially released with DOSBox
Interplay Entertainment games
NEC PC-9801 games
Role-playing video games
Video game sequels
Video games developed in Australia
Video games featuring protagonists of selectable gender
Xbox Cloud Gaming games
Single-player video games
Video games developed in the United States